München Menterschwaige is a proposed Munich S-Bahn railway station to be built on the eastern bank of the river Isar, in the Menterschwaige district of the Munich borough of Untergiesing-Harlaching. If built, it will provide interchange access between the S-Bahn lines 20 and 27 and the tram lines 15 and 25 at nearby Großhesseloher Brücke tram station as well as transportation services for the whole of the Menterschwaige district and nearby Grünwald with its film production sites at Bavaria Film Studios.

References

Proposed railway stations in Germany
Menterschwaige